Gibbsia is a genus of parasitic alveolates of the phylum Apicomplexa.

There is only one species known in this genus, Gibbsia archiuli.

Taxonomy

This genus was created by Levine for a species of protozoa that was discovered by Gibbs in 1952.

Description

The only known species in this genus was found in South Africa.

It infects the garden millipede (Archiulus moreleti).

Merogony, gamogony and sporogony occur within the host's blood cells.

Microgametes are not flagellated.

Oocysts contain four sporocysts. Each sporocyst has a single sporozoite.

References

Conoidasida
Parasites of arthropods